Kurukshetra is an ancient Indian region.

Kurukshetra may also refer to:

 Kurukshetra district
 Kurukshetra (Lok Sabha constituency)
 Kurukshetra, 1946 Hindi epic poem by Ramdhari Singh Dinkar

Films
 Kurukshetra (1945 film), Hindi film
 Kurukshetra (2000 film), Hindi film
 Kurukshetra (2002 film), a Bengali film
 Kurukshetra (2008 film), Malayalam film
 Kurukshetra (2013 film), Marathi film
 Kurukshetra (2019 film), Kannada  film
 Kurukshethram (1970 film), Malayalam film
 Kurukshetram (1977 film), Telugu film
 Kurukshetram (2006 film), Tamil film

Others
 Kurukshetra War
 Kurukshetra (college festival), festival at College of Engineering, Guindy, Anna University, Chennai
 Kurukshetra (album) by Rudra